Mikhail Kukushkin was the defending champion and reached the final. Arnau Brugués-Davi defeated him 4–6, 6–3, 6–2 to win the title.

Seeds

Draw

Finals

Top half

Bottom half

References
 Main Draw
 Qualifying Draw

2011 ATP Challenger Tour
2011,Singles
2011 in Russian tennis